Quyujaq, also rendered as Quyjaq, may refer to:
 Quyujaq, Heris
 Quyujaq, Meyaneh